Louis Christoffel (born 1886, date of death unknown) was a Belgian wrestler. He competed in the Greco-Roman lightweight event at the 1924 Summer Olympics.

References

External links
 

1886 births
Year of death missing
Olympic wrestlers of Belgium
Wrestlers at the 1924 Summer Olympics
Belgian male sport wrestlers
Place of birth missing